George S. S. Codington was a politician in the Dakota Territory. He was a member of the Dakota Territorial House of Representatives in now Brookings County, South Dakota. Aside from politics, he served as a minister. He died from tuberculosis in Wisconsin.

Codington County, South Dakota is named for him.

References

Members of the Dakota Territorial Legislature
19th-century American politicians
People from Brookings County, South Dakota
People from Wisconsin
Year of death missing
Year of birth missing